West Coast Drive is a scenic north-south route along the Indian Ocean in the northern suburbs of Perth, Western Australia.

History
The road was initially a street which formed part of North Beach, which from the 1920s onwards was a coastal village which served as a holiday destination for Perth residents. During the Great Depression a tent city was located at the North Beach Road intersection. The road had to navigate around the original Hamersley family residence at Beachton Street, but this was demolished in 1961 under Town Planning Scheme No.14 which was drafted in 1959 by the Shire of Perth in order that the road could be straightened. In 1967, the road was extended north to the newly built Sacred Heart College in Sorrento.

Before 1985, West Coast Drive was part of West Coast Highway and connected through to Scarborough. However, the demands of massive urban growth in the northern suburbs necessitated the extension of Marmion Avenue to Scarborough. West Coast Drive was cut off in Trigg and southbound traffic directed onto Karrinyup Road.

In recent years, two- and three-storey houses, often with wide front windows and balconies, have been constructed along the east side of the road.

Public transportation
Until 2015, during the summer its entire length, which is mostly a single-carriageway road with one lane in each direction and many curves, was served by Transperth bus routes ferrying passengers between the beaches, including Mettams Pool at Trigg, Watermans Beach, Marmion Beach and Sorrento Beach. Transperth abolished route 458 in 2015, and the still existing route 423 serves only the northern part of West Coast Drive.

See also

References

Roads in Perth, Western Australia
Articles containing video clips